Acajutla Futbol Club  is a Salvadoran professional football club based in Acajutla. 
They changed their name in 1989 season to the Tiburones.

History
The club started as El Puerto de Acajutla, the club later changed to Tiburones, during their first Primera División campaign. Prior to the club relegation they changed their name to Árabe Marte. The club won promotion to the Primera División for the 1997–1998 season before they sold their spot to Atletico Marte.
The club briefly returned in 2008–2009, however they become defunct again.

Honours

Domestic honours
 Segunda División Salvadorean and predecessors 
 Champions (1) : TBD
 Tercera División Salvadorean and predecessors 
 Champions:(1) : TBD

Sponsors

 1995–1996: Canal 12, Umbro, Coca-Cola, Urgente Express

Record

Year-by-year

Notable Players
  Eraldo Correia
  Carlos Cacho Melenedez (1987)
  Oscar Lagarto Ulloa (1987)
  Carlos Asrubal Padin

Captains

Former coaches
  Juan Quarterone
  Conrado Miranda
  Ricardo Lopez Tenorio (1987)
  Demar Moran (1993–1994)
  Saul Molina (February 1995-)
  Jorge Patris		October 1995	
  Raimundo Amaya Revelo	October 1995	
  Victor Manuel Pacheco October 1995	
  Carlos Melendez	October 1995

Acajutla-Tiburones F.C.